Roy Bethell (born Watford, 9 August 1906, died Watford, 5 November 1976) was an English footballer who played professionally for clubs including Charlton Athletic and Gillingham. He made 170 Football League appearances for the latter club.

References

1906 births
1976 deaths
Sportspeople from Watford
English footballers
Gillingham F.C. players
Charlton Athletic F.C. players
St Albans City F.C. players
Association football inside forwards